La Meri (Russell Meriwether Hughes; May 13, in 1898 – January 7, in 1988) was an American ethnic dancer, choreographer, teacher, poet, anthropologist and scholar.

Early life and training
She was born Russell Meriwether Hughes in Louisville, Kentucky and began her dance training in Texas, studying ballet, Spanish, and Mexican dance forms.  She continued her training in Hawaii, where she studied Hawaiian dance, and then New York, where she studied modern dance and ballet.

Career
In 1928, La Meri began performing professionally. In the 1930s, she invited Indian classical dancer, Ram Gopal, one of the early pioneers of dance of India in the west, who toured with her extensively.  Until 1940, she toured and studied in areas such as Central and South America, Europe, North Africa, Australia, New Zealand, Tasmania, India, Burma, Indonesia, the Philippines, China, Japan, Ceylan, and Hawaii.  As she traveled, La Meri learned the native dances of the different areas she visited, studying with local dance masters.  She went on to create her own dance works based on the steps and movement vocabularies she learned. She researched the dance styles of Latin America, Spain, Africa, and Asia extensively. This allowed her to bring authenticity to the stage in a way that rang true to the roots of each dance style. 
    
In 1940, La Meri and Ruth St. Denis founded the "School of Natya", which is Hindu dance, in New York City.  Through the school, La Meri formed The Five Natyas, her first performing company.  In 1945 she absorbed the school of Natya into Ethnologic Dance Center and the Ethnologic Dance Theater, which operated from 1942-1956.  She also performed at the American Museum of Natural History
and presented concert programs of young ethnic-dancers from across the globe. In 1944, she choreographed swan lake with the translation into Hindu dance movements. She did not change ballet's music and plot, but added a prologue and a danced fight between the princess and the Rothbart.

La Meri taught regularly at Jacob’s Pillow, gave lecture-demonstrations, and published a number of magazine articles and books, including The Gesture Language of Hindu Dance (1941) and Spanish Dancing (1948).  The latter book is considered to be a definitive text on the subject of Spanish dance.  Overall, La Meri’s extensive work in ethnic dance earned her the reputation of being one of the foremost experts in the ethnic-dance field. La Meri's work helped to inspire other choreographers to show respect for dances of cultures not their own, as well as educating the audience. Her thorough anthropological work embodied the values of each ethnicity she used in her choreography and highlighted the importance of integrity in the dance world.

In 1938 La Meri published a book "Songs and Voyages," with 82 pages of poetry, now very rare.  [Livorno -Arti Grafiche S. Belfort & C. 5 Dicembre 1938 - XVII, printed in Italy] According to the frontispiece, her poetry had appeared in American Poetry Magazine, Literary Digest, Braithwaite Anthology, L'Alouette, The Harp, The Dance Magazine, Independent Poetry Anthology, Lariat, Circle, Buccaneer, Contemporary Verse, Interludes, Gammadion, Texas Anthology, Bozart, American Anthology, Poetry Journal, Bright Scrawl, Unicorn, Home Magazine, Present Day Poets, Wandering Eros, more.

She received Capezio Dance Award in 1972.

References 

Au, Susan, and Jim Rutter. Ballet and Modern Dance. 3rd ed. London: Thames & Hudson, 2012. Print.

External links
Archival footage of La Meri performing her piece "Hamsa-Rani" at Jacob's Pillow in 1951
La Meri photographs, 1898-1988, held by the Jerome Robbins Dance Division, New York Public Library for the Performing Arts.

American female dancers
Dancers from Kentucky
People from Louisville, Kentucky
American choreographers
1898 births
1988 deaths
Dance teachers
Dance writers
Folk dancers
20th-century American non-fiction writers
20th-century American dancers
20th-century American women writers